Baharampur, Bangladesh is a village in Patuakhali District in the Barisal Division of southern-central Bangladesh.

References

External links
Satellite map at Maplandia.com

Populated places in Patuakhali District